A dilated pore, also known as a dilated pore of Winer, is a cutaneous condition characterized by a solitary, prominent, open comedo on the face or upper trunk of an individual. Louis H. Winer is credited with discovering the dilated pore.

See also 
 List of cutaneous conditions
 Trichodiscoma

References 

Epidermal nevi, neoplasms, and cysts